Mohammed Al-Menqash (born 7 August 1990) is a Saudi football player who currently plays as a forward for Al-Shoulla.

Honours
Al-Fayha
First Division: 2016–17

Abha
MS League: 2018–19

References

External links
 

1990 births
Living people
Saudi Arabian footballers
Al-Ard Club players
Al-Faisaly FC players
Al-Mujazzal Club players
Al-Fayha FC players
Al-Shoulla FC players
Abha Club players
Al-Nahda Club (Saudi Arabia) players
Al Jeel Club players
Al-Sahel SC (Saudi Arabia) players
Al-Kholood Club players
Saudi First Division League players
Saudi Professional League players
Saudi Second Division players
Association football forwards